I pinguini ci guardano (i.e.

Plot 

The daily life in a zoo seen through the eyes of their residents, with the animals talking, exposing their problems, and commenting the gestures of men.

Cast 

Renato Rascel 
Carlo Croccolo  
Fiorenzo Fiorentini  
Ave Ninchi
Isa Barzizza
Rosalba Neri
Alba Arnova
Tina De Mola
Isa Miranda 
Tino Scotti
Clelia Matania
Emma Danieli
Domenico Modugno
Renzo Giovampietro
Turi Pandolfini
Luigi Pavese
Aldo Fabrizi (voice)
Tina Lattanzi (voice)
Anna Magnani  (voice)
Paolo Panelli   (voice)
Alberto Sordi  (voice)
Franca Valeri  (voice)

References

External links

I pinguini ci guardano at Variety Distribution

Italian comedy films
1956 comedy films
1956 films
Films directed by Guido Leoni
1950s Italian films